Agrostology (from Greek , agrōstis, "type of grass"; and , -logia), sometimes graminology, is the scientific study of the grasses (the family Poaceae, or Gramineae). The grasslike species of the sedge family (Cyperaceae), the rush family (Juncaceae), and the bulrush or cattail family (Typhaceae) are often included with the true grasses in the category of graminoid, although strictly speaking these are not included within the study of agrostology. In contrast to the word graminoid, the words gramineous and graminaceous are normally used to mean "of, or relating to, the true grasses (Poaceae)".

Agrostology has importance in the maintenance of wild and grazed grasslands, agriculture (crop plants such as rice, maize, sugarcane, and wheat are grasses, and many types of animal fodder are grasses), urban and environmental horticulture, turfgrass management and sod production, ecology, and conservation.

Botanists that made important contributions to agrostology include:
 Jean Bosser
 Aimée Antoinette Camus
 Mary Agnes Chase
 Eduard Hackel
 Charles Edward Hubbard
 A. S. Hitchcock
 Ernst Gottlieb von Steudel
 Otto Stapf

 Joseph Dalton Hooker
 Norman Loftus Bor
 Jan-Frits Veldkamp
 William Derek Clayton

 Thomas Arthur Cope

Grasses
Agrostology
 01